Warren Ernest Cooper  (born 21 February 1933) is a former New Zealand politician. He was a National Party MP from 1975 to 1996, holding cabinet positions including Minister of Foreign Affairs and Minister of Defence. Cooper also twice served as Mayor of Queenstown, from 1968 to 1975 and 1995 to 2001.

Early life and career
Cooper was born in Dunedin in 1933. He received his education at Musselburgh School and King's High School. He later moved to Queenstown after leaving school at 15. He worked as a retailer, a painting, decorating and signwriting contractor, and a motel manager. He then became a real estate agent and was a leading member of the Jaycees, being awarded with life membership.

Political career

Cooper was Mayor of Queenstown Borough from 1968 to 1975. As mayor Cooper successfully lobbied the then Minister of Finance Robert Muldoon to allow the Queenstown Borough Council to sell land in the Queenstown Hill Commonage in order to fund new water and sewerage schemes. He joined the National Party and was elected a member of the party's dominion council in 1973.

He was first elected to Parliament in the 1975 election as MP for Otago Central, defeating the newly elected Ian Quigley of the Labour Party.

Just after the 1978 election, his ministerial career started. He was Minister of Tourism (1978–1981), Minister of Regional Development (1978–1981), Postmaster-General (1980–1981), and Minister of Broadcasting (1981). When Brian Talboys retired from Parliament in 1981, Cooper was appointed to replace him as Minister of Foreign Affairs; he held this position until the government of Robert Muldoon was defeated in 1984. He got along well with the now Prime Minister Muldoon despite having differing views on policy, Cooper describing Muldoon as a socialist while Muldoon thinking Cooper the caucus' chief private enterpriser (a label Cooper embraced).

After the governments defeat he was retained on the frontbench by Muldoon and was designated Shadow Minister of Foreign Affairs and Overseas Trade. He retained those portfolios for most of Jim McLay's brief tenure as National leader (1984–86) before being dropped from Foreign Affairs by McLay's successor Jim Bolger and instead given the Local Government, Regional Development and South Island Development portfolios. Following National's defeat in  he had another portfolio shift, retaining only Overseas Trade while also gaining Transport. In a reshuffle in early 1990 he swapped the Transport portfolio for Tourism.

Later, in the government of Jim Bolger, Cooper served as Minister of Defence (1990–96), Minister of Local Government (1990-94) and Minister of Internal Affairs (1993–96). Cooper remained in Parliament until the 1996 election, when he stepped aside in favour of Gavan Herlihy.

He transitioned back to local-body politics and was Mayor of Queenstown-Lakes from 1995 to 2001. Still an MP and minister at the time of his election as mayor there was speculation he might resign from cabinet or parliament altogether but stated he would not do so unless asked to by Bolger. He was involved in a public disagreement over development with actor Sam Neill in 2000, over development in Queenstown. Cooper said he enjoyed the stoush with Neill (a known Labour Party supporter) who later gave him a case of "socialist chardonnay".

Honours and awards
In 1977, Cooper was awarded the Queen Elizabeth II Silver Jubilee Medal, and in 1990 he received the New Zealand 1990 Commemoration Medal. In the 1997 New Year Honours, Cooper was appointed a Companion of the New Zealand Order of Merit, for public services.

Personal life
Cooper and his wife Lorraine have five children. His future wife had been employed at a hotel in Queenstown owned by his father. They married in Brisbane in 1956.

Notes

References

|-

|-

1933 births
Living people
Members of the Cabinet of New Zealand
New Zealand defence ministers
New Zealand foreign ministers
Tourism ministers of New Zealand
New Zealand National Party MPs
Politicians from Dunedin
People from Queenstown, New Zealand
Mayors of Queenstown-Lakes
Companions of the New Zealand Order of Merit
Members of the New Zealand House of Representatives
New Zealand justices of the peace
New Zealand MPs for South Island electorates
People educated at King's High School, Dunedin